The discography of American electronic music duo The Crystal Method comprises five studio albums, four compilation albums, three soundtrack albums, one extended play, twenty singles, and nine music videos. The album Vegas has sold more than one million copies in the United States, certifying it platinum. It is one of the best selling electronic albums in the United States, and it puts The Crystal Method in the top five best selling electronic bands in the United States. The Crystal Method's other three studio albums, Tweekend, Legion of Boom, and Divided by Night have charted high on the Billboard 200, especially for electronic albums, all making it to the thirties and charting especially high on the Top Electronic Albums list.

Albums

Studio albums

Compilation albums

Box sets

Mix albums

Soundtrack albums

Extended plays

Singles

Remixes

Music videos

References

Discographies of American artists
Electronic music discographies